Parkview School is an elementary junior high school located in the Parkview neighbourhood of Edmonton, Alberta, Canada.

Attendance

Parkview School is a district site for a variety of programs in the West end of Edmonton. It has several designated feeder schools, but students attend from many parts of the city and surrounding areas. It currently has an attendance of approximately 590 students.

Programs

Parkview School offers a variety of programs, including:

 Pre AP
 Secondary Languages: French, Mandarin Chinese, Spanish
 Special Needs: Interactions, Community Mental Health Classrooms, ESL
 Innovate
 Foods & Fashion
 Computer studies
 Drama
 Art
 Music
 Outdoor education
 Sports performance

Academics

Parkview School is known to have a reputation for academic excellence; the school is constantly placed in the top 10 standings of the city. The school's Provincial Achievement Test results have consistently placed above the provincial average. The school participates in a variety of Mathematic contests (Gauss, Atlantic-Pacific, CNML, Pascal, AMC 8, Edmonton Junior High Math Contest).

Extracurricular
Parkview School not only prides itself as an academic, but also athletic school. The school also has many different clubs offered. The clubs are extra-curricular and are often on during lunches and after school. The school team's mascot is a panther, so the school teams are often dubbed "The Panthers". There are a wide range of extracurricular activities in the school, including:

School teams

Boys Junior and Senior Basketball team 
Girls Junior and Senior Basketball team 
Boys Junior and Senior Volleyball team 
Girls Junior and Senior Volleyball team
Boys Junior and Senior Badminton team 
Girls Junior and Senior Badminton team
Boys & girls Soccer team
Co-ed Indoor Soccer team 
Flag rugby team
Cross country running team
Track and Field team

School clubs

Ski and Snowboard Club
Concert Band
Jazz Band

External links and references
Parkview School Website
Official website of Edmonton Public Schools

Middle schools in Edmonton
Educational institutions established in 1957
1957 establishments in Alberta